A Bachelor of Commerce (abbreviated BComm or BCom; also, baccalaureates commercii) is an undergraduate degree in business, usually awarded in Canada, Australia, India, Sri Lanka, Pakistan, Ireland, New Zealand, Ghana, South Africa, Myanmar, Egypt, and additional Commonwealth countries. The degree was previously  offered in the United Kingdom.

Structure

Bachelor of Commerce
The Bachelor of Commerce degree is designed to provide students with a wide range of managerial skills, while building competence in a particular area of business  (see aside). 
For a comparison with other business degrees, see .

Most universities, therefore, plan the degree such that in addition to their major, students are exposed to general business principles, taking courses in accounting, finance, economics, business management, human resources and marketing. 
Programs often require foundational courses in business statistics and mathematics, and information systems. 

Depending on the institution, a formal academic major may or may not be established. Regardless, a Bachelor of Commerce degree requires students to take the majority of their courses in business-related subjects, including the aside, among others.

Bachelor of Commerce (Honours)
The Honours Bachelor of Commerce (HonsBCom or BComm (Hons) or HBCom or HBComm) is further advanced. 
The degree has a specialization aspect, analogous to the BBA, developing the student's business skills and/or providing in-depth knowledge of the field.

It requires additional academic courses to be completed, and usually with higher academic performance standards, and may also require a researched thesis component. 
It often serves as an abridgement (or entry requirement) between the undergraduate program and postgraduate programs, including the Master of Commerce (M.Com. or M.Comm.) and the Master of Business Administration (MBA) degrees.

It may consist of a four-year program or of a one-year program taken subsequent to a three-year Bachelor's degree; 
the one-year program is typically focused exclusively on a single subject-area.

Duration
The curriculum generally lasts three years in Australia, New Zealand, India, Malta, South Africa, some parts of Canada, and Hong Kong. The curriculum requires four years of study in the Republic of Ireland, the majority of Canada, Egypt, Ghana, Pakistan, the Philippines, the Netherlands, Sri Lanka and Nepal.

In South Africa, New Zealand, Australia and some universities in India, the BCom (Hons) degree is considered an additional postgraduate qualification, whereas in Malta, an additional year of study is not considered a postgraduate qualification.

History

The Bachelor of Commerce degree was first offered at the University of Birmingham. The University's School of Commerce was founded by William Ashley, an Englishman from Oxford University, who was the first professor of Political Economy and Constitutional History in the Faculty of Arts at the University of Toronto. Ashley left Toronto in 1892, spent a few years at Harvard University, and then went back to England to the new University of Birmingham where he founded the School of Commerce. Ashley began the programme which was the forerunner of many other BCom degree programmes throughout the British Empire.

Eighteenth-century economists had divided the English economy into three sectors: agriculture, manufacturing, and commerce. Commerce included the transport, marketing and financing of goods. The Birmingham programme in commerce included economic geography, economic history, general economics, modern languages, and accountancy.

See also
Bachelor of Accountancy
Bachelor of Business
Bachelor of Business Administration
Bachelor of Business Science
Bachelor of Economics
Bachelor of Finance
Business school
 
 Master of Commerce
 Master of Business Administration

References

Commerce, Bachelor of
Business qualifications